Stellar Photo Recovery, previously known as Stellar Phoenix Photo Recovery, is a multimedia files recovery utility for both Windows and Mac based computers and is developed by Stellar.

References

External links
 

Data recovery
Data recovery software
Hard disk software
Shareware
Computer data